Alassane Meite (born 9 June 2000) is a French footballer who currently plays as a forward .

Career statistics

Club

Notes

References

2000 births
Living people
French footballers
Association football forwards
UAE Pro League players
Paris Saint-Germain F.C. players
Leicester City F.C. players
Fujairah FC players
Expatriate footballers in England
French expatriate sportspeople in England
Expatriate footballers in the United Arab Emirates
French expatriate sportspeople in the United Arab Emirates